Kinglet was a boosted fission primary used in several American thermonuclear weapons.

The W55 warhead for the UUM-44 SUBROC anti-submarine missile and the W58 warhead for Polaris A-3 were designed to use Kinglet, while the W47 warhead for Polaris A-1/A-2 were retrofitted with Kinglet to overcome the technical issues with the Robin primary the W47 was initially deployed with. Allegedly, only the W47Y2 was converted to the Mod 3 design using Kinglet.

Design

The device was of the two-point design. Two-point devices only require two detonators to fire the whole device, compared to earlier nuclear weapons that required tens of detonators.

Characteristics of the warheads that used Kinglet are:

See also
 List of nuclear weapons
 Teller-Ulam design
 Tsetse primary
 Python primary

Notes

References

Bibliography
 Beware the old story by Chuck Hansen, Bulletin of the Atomic Scientists, March/April 2001 pp. 52-55 (vol. 57, no. 02)
http://nuclearweaponarchive.org/Usa/Weapons?Allbombs.html
The History of the UK. Strategic Deterrent: The Chevaline Programme.  Published:2004 by the Royal Aeronautical Society, London.

Nuclear bombs of the United States